Lobe is a surname. Notable people with the surname include:

 Adolf Lobe (1860–1939), German jurist and member of the Reichstag in the Weimar Republic
 Bill Lobe (1912–1969), American baseball player and coach
 Jim Lobe (born 1949), American journalist
 Kārlis Lobe (1895–1985), Latvian collaborationist with the Nazis
 Mira Lobe (1913–1995), Austrian author
 Robert Lawrance Lobe (born 1945), American sculptor

German-language surnames